My Japanese Niece is a 2015 Japanese-Meitei bilingual film, directed by Mohen Naorem. It stars Junichi Kajioka and Yu Asada in lead roles.

The film has three major roles; the Japanese soldier (played by Junichi Kajioka), the Japanese niece named Asada (played by actress Yu Asada) and the adopted daughter.

The film featured 100 soldiers from the Royal Thai Army, who took the roles of World War II Japanese soldiers.

Plot 
Asada, a young Japanese lady, comes to Manipur to pay homage to her dead uncle, who died in the Battle of Imphal in 1944. In Manipur, she had a dream. In her dream, her uncle asked her to go to a village. But Asada discovered that a man who looked like her uncle had died a few months back. Asada decided to find out the truth. She discovered about the trials and problems faced by the Japanese soldiers in India. She also discovered many unpublished letters and diaries. Her findings helped her a lot to search for the truth.

Cast 
 Junichi Kajioka
 Yu Asada
 Shunsaku Kudo
 Tomoko Hayakawa
 Bala Hijam
 Gokul Athokpam
 Abenao Elangbam
 Kaiku Rajkumar
 Bijou Thaangjam
 Randy Brown
 Wungthingchon Raihing Shimray

Production 
"My Japanese Niece" looked into a Japanese army's life after the battle. 
Director Mohen Naorem was inspired by an earthquake that hit Japan in the year 2011. During the earthquake, the Japanese army played an important role in helping the victims. He believed that the film will expose the humanitarianism of the soldiers in the Battle of Imphal of 1944.

The shooting of the film was done in Bangkok (Thailand), Tokyo (Japan), Manipur (India) and some places of the Indo-Myanmar border.

See also 
 Imphal 1944
 Japan Landa Imphal

References

External links 

 
 
 
 

Battle of Imphal films
Japanese-Meitei culture
2010s Japanese-language films
2010s Meitei-language films
Japanese war drama films
Indian World War II films
2010s Japanese films
2015 multilingual films
Japanese multilingual films